Seek Again is an American-bred Thoroughbred racehorse. After winning three of his seven races in the United Kingdom he was sent to California in December 2013 and won the Grade I Hollywood Derby.

On August 9, 2014, Seek Again won the Grade II Fourstardave Handicap in a Saratoga Race Course record time.

Seek Again entered stallion duty at Stroud's Lane Farm in Reddick, Florida for the 2016 breeding season.

References

2010 racehorse births
Racehorses bred in Kentucky
Racehorses trained in the United Kingdom
Racehorses trained in the United States
Horse racing track record setters
Thoroughbred family 8-h